Ahmet Gülhan is a Turkish freestyle wrestler competing in the 74 kg division. He is a member of Amasya Şekerspor.

He participated in Men's freestyle 74 kg at 2008 Summer Olympics. After beating Ali Abdo from Australia he lost with Buvaisar Saitiev from Russia. In Repechage Round he lost with and was eliminated by Cho Byung-Kwan from South Korea.

He was suspended from wrestling for two years after doping testing positive for banned for used Efedrin

References

External links
 

Turkish male sport wrestlers
Olympic wrestlers of Turkey
Wrestlers at the 2008 Summer Olympics
Sportspeople from Ankara
1978 births
Living people
European champions for Turkey
European Wrestling Champions
Doping cases in wrestling
Turkish sportspeople in doping cases
21st-century Turkish people